Nogometni klub Šmarje pri Jelšah, commonly referred to as NK Šmarje pri Jelšah or simply Šmarje pri Jelšah, is a Slovenian football club based in the town of Šmarje pri Jelšah. The club was established in June 1942. As of the 2022–23 season, they play in the Celje Intercommunal League, the fourth highest league in Slovenia.

Honours
Slovenian Fourth Division
 Winners: 2000–01, 2011–12

MNZ Celje Cup
 Winners: 2011–12

League history since 1991

References

External links
Official website 

Association football clubs established in 1942
Football clubs in Slovenia
1942 establishments in Slovenia